As well as being a general epithet, Ephebus (ancient Greek - adolescent) often occurs as an individual name, as in the cases of: 
Ephebus, a martyr from Terni, a city in central Italy
Claudius Ephebus, mentioned in the first letter of Clement to the Corinthians, chapter 59, as a messenger of the church of Rome, sent to the Church of Corinth along with Valerius Bito and Fortunatus
St. Euphebius (Ephebus), a bishop of Naples.

Saints from Roman Italy